Cynonville Halt railway station served the village of Cynonville, in the historical county of Glamorganshire, Wales, from 1912 to 1956 on the Rhondda and Swansea Bay Railway.

History 
The station was opened in October 1912, although it was open earlier for workers of the nearby Cynon and Argoed collieries. It first appeared as Cynon Colliery and Pontrhydyfen Argoed in the 1899 fare table. It originally had no platforms so workers had to board and alight from the trackside. A platform was built in 1902, the other one being built later. Its name later appeared as Cynon New Pit and it was changed to Cynonville Halt when it opened publicly. It closed on 2 January 1956. The track bed is now a cycle path and the platforms still survive.

References

External links 

Disused railway stations in Neath Port Talbot
Railway stations in Great Britain opened in 1912
Railway stations in Great Britain closed in 1956
1912 establishments in Wales
1956 disestablishments in Wales